Pallada ( — Pallas) is the name of several ships of the Russian navy.

 , a sailing frigate
 , the lead ship of her class of protected cruiser
 , a  armored cruiser

A commercial sailing vessel also bears the name Pallada
 , a modern tallship

See also 

 Josip Pallada
 Euceriodes pallada
 Pallada Asset Management

Ship names